Southern River is a suburb of Perth, Western Australia, located within the City of Gosnells.

It was originally a rural area with farms for egg production, horse breeding properties and boarding kennels for cats and dogs. These farms combined gave the area a population of less than 500 people.

The result will be a population increase to above 15,000; along with this will be the building of all the necessary infrastructure like shops, schools, park and gardens. 

The region bounded by Ranford Road, Passmore Street, Matison Street and Holmes Road, is likely to retain its special status and unique lifestyle for the foreseeable future.  Most residents are deeply involved in either greyhound racing or the breeding showing and trialling of pedigree dogs and/or cats.  Several boarding catteries and kennels are found in the area, servicing a large proportion of the Perth metropolitan area.

Facilities 
There is a local shopping centre, Southern River Shopping Centre, along Bristile Avenue and Ranford Road. A Coles Supermarket anchors the precinct. Bunnings Harrisdale is opposite the shopping centre. The state public secondary college, Southern River College, is located along Southern River Road but in Gosnells proper.

References

External links

Suburbs of Perth, Western Australia
Suburbs in the City of Gosnells